Anastasis is a 2012 studio album by the British-Australian band Dead Can Dance. It is the eighth studio album by the band and the first after Brendan Perry and Lisa Gerrard disbanded in 1998. It was officially released on 13 August  2012 by PIAS Recordings, 16 years after the group's last album, Spiritchaser. It is also the band's first album since it left 4AD. "Anastasis" is the Greek word for "resurrection".

To date, Anastasis sold over 150,000 copies worldwide.

In 2014, it was awarded a double gold certification from the Independent Music Companies Association, which indicated sales of at least 150,000 copies throughout Europe.

Reception
Anastasis received generally favorable reviews based on 16 critics at Metacritic.

Track listing

LP track listing

Personnel
Dead Can Dance
 Brendan Perry
 Lisa Gerrard

Additional musician
 David Kuckhermann – daf, pantam

Production
 Dead Can Dance – producer
 Aidan Foley – mastering
 Zsolt Zsigmond – photography

Charts

Certifications

References

External links
  at the band's official website
 
 
 

2012 albums
Dead Can Dance albums
PIAS Recordings albums